The 2019 New Mexico United season is the inaugural season for New Mexico United in the USL Championship, the second-tier professional soccer league in the United States and Canada.

Club

Current roster

Competitions

Exhibition

USL Championship

Standings

Match results

The 2019 USL Championship season schedule for the club was announced on December 19, 2018.

Unless otherwise noted, all times in MST

USL Cup Playoffs

U.S. Open Cup

As a member of the USL Championship, New Mexico United will enter the tournament in the Second Round, to be played May 14–15, 2019

References

New Mexico United
New Mexico United
New Mexico
New Mexico United